The Fassmer FPB 20 patrol boat is a unique patrol boat built originally for the Bremen Police under the name of Bremen 9.

In 2007, The boat was turned over to the Lebanese navy and has been renamed Naqoura, after the Naqoura coastal town in Lebanon.

In addition to its usual facilities the boat is also equipped with 3 m Daughter Boat with Crane, and a water cannon for fire fighting.

References 

Patrol boats
Bremen (city)